Songkwae Technical College is located in Phitsanulok, Thailand.  

The school is a state sponsored vocational school with students between 15 and 22 years old.  In 2012 there is approximately 300 students and 60 staff including teachers.

References

Phitsanulok